Paulo Jorge Caetano Gomes (born 15 May 1973 in Celorico da Beira, Beira Interior Norte) is a Portuguese marathon runner. He set a personal best time of 2:12:51, by finishing third at the 2007 Volkswagen Marathon in Prague, Czech Republic.

At age thirty-five, Gomes made his official debut for the 2008 Summer Olympics in Beijing, where he competed in the men's marathon, along with his teammate Hélder Ornelas. He successfully finished the race in thirtieth place by four seconds behind Russia's Oleg Kulkov, with a time of 2:18:15.

References

External links

NBC 2008 Olympics profile

Portuguese male marathon runners
Living people
Olympic athletes of Portugal
Athletes (track and field) at the 2008 Summer Olympics
1973 births
People from Celorico da Beira
Sportspeople from Guarda District